Malegia arabica is a species of leaf beetle of Saudi Arabia.

References

Eumolpinae
Beetles of Asia
Insects of the Arabian Peninsula
Beetles described in 1979